Daybreak is a live album by trumpeter/vocalist Chet Baker which was recorded in 1979 at the Jazzhus Montmartre and released on the Danish SteepleChase label.

Reception 

The Allmusic review by Scott Yanow states "Baker is in fine form stretching out on these six- to eleven-minute performances".

Track listing 
 "For Minors Only" (Jimmy Heath) – 6:28
 "Daybreak" (Hoagy Carmichael) – 11:24
 "You Can't Go Home Again" (Don Sebesky) – 11:04 Bonus track on CD release
 "Broken Wing" (Richie Beirach) – 8:01
 "Down" (Miles Davis) – 11:04

Personnel 
Chet Baker – trumpet, vocals
Doug Raney – guitar
Niels-Henning Ørsted Pedersen – bass

References 

Chet Baker live albums
1980 live albums
SteepleChase Records live albums
Albums recorded at Jazzhus Montmartre